Dora Patricia Mercado Castro (born 1957 in Ciudad Obregón, Sonora) is a 
Mexican feminist politician. She is a founder, former president and the 2006 presidential candidate of the extinct Social Democratic Party.

Mercado Castro received a bachelor's degree in economics from the National Autonomous University of Mexico (UNAM). In 1992 she received a scholarship from the MacArthur Foundation and three years later, she represented Mexico in the World Conference on Women in Beijing, China.

Although in 1991 she was a candidate of the Labor Party to the Chamber of Deputies, she is better known for competing in the primary election for the Social Democracy (in Spanish: Democracia Social) nomination in the 2000 presidential elections against party leader Gilberto Rincón Gallardo and heading México Posible, a defunct political party that failed to secure its registry in the 2003 federal election. While in campaign, she actively promoted abortion rights, gay marriage, the legalization of marijuana and unsuccessfully took several Catholic bishops to court for distributing political pamphlets against her party.

She was the presidential candidate for Alternativa during the 2006 elections, obtaining 2.7% of the popular vote, which was enough to secure the party's national registration. Her campaign was considered particularly successful, considering she ran without any private or public funding. The first presidential debate during the campaign is considered her best performance.

References

1957 births
Living people
Mexican feminists
National Autonomous University of Mexico alumni
Candidates in the 2006 Mexican presidential election
People from Ciudad Obregón
Politicians from Sonora
Mexican abortion-rights activists
Mexican LGBT rights activists
Labor Party (Mexico) politicians
Social Democratic Party (Mexico) politicians
Social Democracy (Mexico) politicians
21st-century Mexican politicians
21st-century Mexican women politicians
Members of the Senate of the Republic (Mexico)
Women members of the Senate of the Republic (Mexico)